State Route 20 (SR 20) is a state highway in the northern-central region of the state of California, running east–west north of Sacramento from the North Coast to the Sierra Nevada. Its west end is at SR 1 in Fort Bragg, from where it heads east past Clear Lake, Colusa, Yuba City, Marysville and Nevada City to I-80 near Emigrant Gap, where eastbound traffic can continue on other routes to Lake Tahoe or Nevada.

Portions of SR 20 are built near the routing of what was first a wagon road and later a turnpike in the late 19th century. This road was extended through the state highway system all the way to Ukiah in the early 20th century, and the missing link near Clear Lake was completed in 1932 before the official designation of this highway as SR 20 in 1934. There have been subsequent improvements to the road, such as the conversion of the Grass Valley portion of the route to freeway standards.

Route description
It heads east, quickly climbing into the Mendocino Range along a ridge and crossing through Dunlap Pass. The highway continues to rise alongside the North Fork Big River and tributaries, crossing another summit and then descending to Willits in the Little Lake Valley via Broaddus Creek. An overlap with US 101 begins in Willits and heads southeasterly to Calpella, north of Ukiah in Redwood Valley. There SR 20 turns east again, crossing the Russian River, passing the north shore of Lake Mendocino, and rising to a summit via the East Fork Russian River and Cold Creek. The roadway again descends alongside the Blue Lakes and Scotts Creek to the junction with SR 29 and the settlement of Upper Lake in the Clear Lake Basin. SR 20 closely follows the northeast shore of Clear Lake, staying right above the water line to avoid the adjacent hills. Where the lake ends, SR 20 continues east, intersecting SR 53 and then following the North Fork Cache Creek and tributaries to the Lake-Colusa County line. During its final descent into the Sacramento Valley, SR 20 intersects SR 16 and curves north and back east, entering the valley via Salt Creek.

Once it enters the flat Sacramento Valley, SR 20 takes a generally straight path, crossing I-5 in Williams, overlapping SR 45 near the west bank of the Sacramento River southeast from Colusa, and then turning back east to cross the Sacramento River and Sutter Bypass on its way to Yuba City. The route crosses SR 99 west of central Yuba City, and runs east through northern Yuba City to the Feather River, which it crosses on the 10th Street Bridge into Marysville. Within the central part of that city, SR 20 makes several turns, first turning south from 10th Street onto E Street, then east on 9th Street (overlapping SR 70), north on B Street, and east on 12th Street (splitting from SR 70). The highway leaves Marysville to the northeast, paralleling the Yuba River on its north side as it enters the foothills of the Sierra Nevada.

SR 20 rises into the Sierra along the north side of the Yuba River, crossing to the south side near Smartsville and then climbing through several ravines to the Penn Valley. The current alignment, built in the mid-1980s as a mostly two-lane freeway, continues east across rugged terrain to the city of Grass Valley, where it joins SR 49 on the Golden Center Freeway. The two routes travel northeast to Nevada City, where SR 49 turns northwest and SR 20 resumes its eastward course as a two-lane highway. The roadway climbs from Nevada City and follows Harmony Ridge and Washington Ridge before descending into the Bear Valley via a series of hairpin turns, and then climbing, just north of Emigrant Gap, to its end at I-80 at Yuba Pass. The Pioneer Trail, a National Recreation Trail, parallels SR 20 from a point on Harmony Ridge to the Bear Valley, and includes parts of a branch of the California Trail first used in 1850.

SR 20 east of US 101 is part of the California Freeway and Expressway System, although it is mostly a two-lane surface road; west of SR 29 and east of SR 53, it is part of the National Highway System, a network of highways that are considered essential to the country's economy, defense, and mobility by the Federal Highway Administration. All of SR 20 is on the Interregional Road System, a highway system that connects major economic centers of the state, and has been selected by the California Department of Transportation (Caltrans) as a High Emphasis Route and Focus Route from US 101 to SR 29 and SR 53 to I-80, with the designated corridor following SR 29 and SR 53 around the south side of Clear Lake. It is also eligible for the State Scenic Highway System from SR 1 to SR 16 and SR 49 to I-80, and has been designated as such for  near the east end; this is part of the federally designated Yuba-Donner Scenic Byway, a National Forest Scenic Byway that uses SR 20 east of SR 49.

History

The east end of SR 20, from Bear Valley (just below Emigrant Gap) to Nevada City, closely follows a branch of the Truckee Route of the California Trail, first used by California-bound emigrants in 1850. Later a turnpike was built here by the same company that opened the Pacific Turnpike (Culbertson Road and Bowman Lake Road between Dutch Flat and Bowman Lake) in 1864.

By the end of the 1910s, a passable dirt and gravel road connected Ukiah and Nevada City via the south side of Clear Lake and Marysville. The portion between Lower Lake and Wilbur Springs was impassable in wet weather, at which times the Bartlett Springs and Bear Valley Toll-road via Upper Lake and Bartlett Springs was available for $1.50 each way or $2.50 round trip. This route generally followed the present SR 20, except around Clear Lake and between Marysville and Rough and Ready (where it used Spenceville Road). Beyond Nevada City to Emigrant Gap, the old turnpike was not passable; instead the present SR 174 was available for eastward drivers. Between Williams and Colusa, the road was paved in concrete, as it had been added to the state highway system as part of the first (1910) bond issue, specifically as Route 15, connecting the west Sacramento Valley trunk (Route 7, now I-5) with the county seat of Colusa.

This state highway was significantly extended in both directions in 1919, west to Ukiah and east to Emigrant Gap, creating what was known as the Tahoe-Ukiah Highway, connecting Ukiah and Lake Tahoe in combination with Route 37 (now I-80) and Route 38 (now SR 89). The law that defined the extension simply stated that it would connect "Ukiah to Tahoe City"; the state decided in September 1925 that it would run the highway along the north shore of Clear Lake, combining with the planned Rumsey-Lower Lake Highway (Route 50, now SR 53 and SR 16) east to Wilbur Springs. With the completion of this segment in mid-1932, the highway was ready for heavy travel, and became Sign Route 20 in 1934 as part of the initial signed state route system.

In 1953, the legislature added an extension of Route 15 from US 101 at Willits (north of Ukiah) west to SR 1 near Fort Bragg. This was constructed (over an existing county road) and became part of Sign Route 20 prior to 1964, when the Route 20 designation was legislatively adopted. Subsequent improvements include the construction of the Golden Center Freeway, connecting Grass Valley with Nevada City, in the late 1960s, and a new alignment of SR 20 west from Grass Valley, bypassing Rough and Ready, in the mid-1980s.

Major intersections

See also

References

External links

 California @ AARoads - California 20
 California Highway Conditions: SR 20
 California Highways: State Route 20

020
020
020
State Route 020
State Route 020
State Route 020
State Route 020
State Route 020
State Route 020
State Route 020
Yuba City, California